Antonia Schmale (born 12 February 1980) is a German former footballer who played as a midfielder. She made three appearances for the Germany national team from 1998 to 2001.

References

External links
 

1980 births
Living people
German women's footballers
Women's association football midfielders
Germany women's international footballers
Footballers from Hamburg